The Chery QQ6 (codename S21) is a city car produced by the Chinese manufacturer Chery Automobile. It is a four-door sedan which is based on a platform self-developed by Chery. Chery discontinued the QQ6 in 2010. A facelifted variant of the QQ6 was known as the Cowin 1 and was sold from 2010 to 2013.

Style & Body description
The QQ6 was designed to appeal to younger buyers with its rounded body. The interior is particularly arranged for comfort during long journeys.

Mechanical description 
The QQ6 is offered with a 1,297 cc  four-cylinder 16V DOHC engine or with a 1,083 cc  unit, of the same configuration as its bigger sister.

Safety 
The car was awarded 2 out of 5 stars in the CNCAP due to low protection in the crash tests.

Marketing outside China 

The car was launched in Chile, Colombia and other Andinean countries in November 2006, where it is badged as the same designation from factory, minus Chile, when is sold as the S21. This model offers the 1.1 litre engine (SQR472F). It is also assembled in Egypt as the Speranza A213. It has also been sold in Ukraine as the "Chery Jaggi".

References

External links 

 Official website of Chery QQ6
 Previous website of Chery QQ6

QQ6
City cars
2010s cars
2000s cars